The Glasgow Fechtbuch (MS E.1939.65.341  in the R. L. Scott Collection of the Glasgow Museums in Glasgow, Scotland) is a combat manual of the German school of fencing, dated to 1505.
Consisting of 105 folia, it combines the instructions of various masters of the 15th century who stood in the tradition of Johannes Liechtenauer, presumably based on a previous compilation made by fencing master Sigmund Schining ein Ringeck.

Contents:
Blossfechten (longsword and messer)
1r - 22r	Gloss of Liechtenauer's longsword Blossfechten by Ringeck (fragment)
22v - 24r	 Additional longsword material by  Ringeck
24v - 25r	 Longsword by Martin Syber
25v - 26v  Messer treatise
27r - 29v	 Additional longsword material by Andres Juden, Jobs von der Nyssen, Nicolas Preussen, and Hans Döbringer (viz., the same "other masters" as referenced in MS 3227a)
35r	 (Image of a seated master, possibly Liechtenauer, reminiscent of the depiction in Cod. 44 A 8)
Ringen (grappling)
35v - 56r	Grappling
64r - 66r	 Grappling by Andre Liegnitzer
67r - 73v	 Grappling by Ott Jud
Rossfechten (mounted combat)
74r - 82r	 Anonymous gloss of Liechtenauer's Rossfechten
Kampffechten (armoured combat) and dagger
83r	Gloss of Liechtenauer's Kampffechten by   Ringeck (one paragraph)
83r - 95v	 Anonymous gloss of Liechtenauer's Kampffechten (armoured combat)
95v - 97v	Dagger by Martin Hundfeld
97v - 100r    Dagger treatise
100v - 104v	Armored combat by Martin Hundfeld
Sword and buckler
105r - 105v	Sword and buckler by Andre Liegnitzer

References
Tobler, Christian Henry. Messer Fighting from the Glasgow Fechtbuch. Wheaton, IL: Freelance Academy Press, 2010.

External links
http://wiktenauer.com/wiki/Glasgow_Fechtbuch_(MS_E.1939.65.341)
http://www.hammaborg.de/en/transkriptionen/emring_glasgow/index.php

16th-century manuscripts
Combat treatises